{{Infobox open cluster
 | name = NGC 7686
 | image = File:NGC_7686.png
 | caption = NGC 7686 (taken from Stellarium)
 | credit = Roberto Mura
 | epoch = J2000
 | class = Open cluster
 | ra = 
 | dec = 
 | dist_ly = 
 | dist_pc = 
 | appmag_v = 5.6
 | size_v = 15′
 | mass_kg = 
 | mass_msol = 
 | radius_ly = 
 | v_hb = 
 | age = 
 | constellation = Andromeda
 | notes = 
 | names = Cr 456, C2327+488, Herschel VII69
|- style="background-color: #A0B0FF;" colspan="3"
 |  Database References
|- bgcolor="#FFFAFA" 
 |  Simbad'' || Simbad NGC 7686
}}NGC 7686''' is a moderately-sized open cluster in the constellation Andromeda, containing about 80 stars. At magnitude 5.6, it is an easy target for binoculars and small telescopes.

According to Johnson et al. (1961), the "color-magnitude diagram shows merely a uniform scatter with no significant tendency to show a cluster main sequence". They conclude that this is not actually a star cluster.

References

External links
 
 http://seds.org

 
7686
Andromeda (constellation)
Open clusters